is a town located in Sorachi Subprefecture, Hokkaido, Japan.

As of September 2016, the town has an estimated population of 3,278. The total area is 39.91 km2. There is a microgravity test facility located in Kamisunagawa used for astronomic purposes.

Since 1980, Kamisunagawa has been the sister city of Sparwood in British Columbia, Canada.

History 
1949 – Kamisunagawa Town split off from the towns of Sunagawa and Utashinai (partial).
2009 – Kamisunagawa Town, more specifically its microgravity test facility, becomes the namesake of a crater on 25143 Itokawa, an asteroid visited by Japanese unmanned spacecraft Hayabusa.

Culture

Mascot

He is a shiitake mushroom. His name is unknown but his name come the either "shiitake town", "see town" or "town of shiitake and coal".

Notable people from Kamisunagawa 
Junichi Watanabe, writer
Ryoko Yamagishi, manga artist
Ikuro Takahashi, drummer

References

External links

Official Website 

Towns in Hokkaido